Gavin Willis Jones  (21 November 1940 – 27 August 2022) was an Australian demographer. He was one of the world's leading scholars on family demography and was one of the most cited scholars on the demography of Asia. He was elected a Fellow of the Academy of the Social Sciences in Australia in 1983.

References

Citations

Bibliography 

1940 births
2022 deaths
Australian demographers

Fellows of the Academy of the Social Sciences in Australia